Seán McCague ( – 24 November 2022) was an Irish Gaelic games administrator, footballer, referee and manager who served as the 33rd president of the Gaelic Athletic Association (2000–2003). He became the first Monaghan man to hold that office.

Career
McCague was born in Scotstown, County Monaghan. He played football at junior level there. However, he won a Monaghan Senior Football Championship with his club (Scotstown) in 1974. An injury to his back ended his playing career prematurely.

He managed the Monaghan senior football team from the late 1970s. He managed his county team to the 1979 Ulster Senior Football Championship (SFC) title and then led it to two further Ulster SFC titles, as well as the National Football League title. The 1979 title win was Monaghan's first for 41 years. He served as Ireland assistant manager under Eugene McGee for the 1987 and 1990 International Rules Series. He was also a referee.

McCague's first involvement in administration was as secretary with his club in 1996. As GAA president he is mostly remembered for the removal of Rule 21 in November 2001. Rule 21 banned members of the British security forces (who were an unwelcome force for most GAA fans) from playing Gaelic games. The rule was abolished despite the opposition of five of the six northern counties (Antrim, Armagh, Derry, Fermanagh and Tyrone). At the annual 2001 GAA Congress, McCague convinced Taoiseach Bertie Ahern to pledge €76 million towards the redevelopment of Croke Park. This amount was later reduced to €38 million.

Personal life
McCague was married, with five daughters. He was principal of Scoil Mhuire in Monaghan, from which he later retired. He died on 24 November 2022, at the age of 77.

References

1940s births
Year of birth missing
2022 deaths
Gaelic football managers
Gaelic football referees
Gaelic games club administrators
Heads of schools in Ireland
Ireland international rules football team
Irish schoolteachers
Monaghan Gaelic footballers
Presidents of the Gaelic Athletic Association